Lieutenant-General Robert Napier (died 23 November 1766) was an officer of the British Army.

Biography
He was appointed ensign in the 2nd Regiment of Foot on 9 May 1722, and reached the rank of captain in the regiment on 21 January 1738. After performing regimental duty a few years, he was placed on the staff, and employed in the Quartermaster-General's Department. In 1742 he was appointed Deputy Quartermaster-General of the forces ordered to Flanders, and in 1745 he was promoted to the rank of lieutenant-colonel. In 1746, he was advanced to the rank of colonel, and he was afterwards appointed Adjutant-General to the Forces. In 1755, King George II appointed him colonel of a newly raised regiment, later 51st Foot; in 1756 he was promoted to the rank of major-general, and on 22 April 1757 he was removed to the 12th Regiment of Foot. In 1759, he was promoted to the rank of lieutenant-general. He died on 23 November 1766, at London.

References

1766 deaths
British Army generals
Queen's Royal Regiment officers
Suffolk Regiment officers
King's Own Yorkshire Light Infantry officers
British Army personnel of the War of the Austrian Succession
Year of birth unknown